Marcia Ann Cain Crone (born December 12, 1952) is an American lawyer and a United States district judge of the United States District Court for the Eastern District of Texas.

Early life and education
Crone was born in 1952 in Dallas, Texas. She graduated from the University of Texas at Austin with a Bachelor of Arts degree in 1973 and from University of Houston Law Center with a Juris Doctor in 1978.

Legal career
Crone started her legal career in private practice in Houston, Texas from 1978 to 1992. She later became a United States magistrate judge of the United States District Court for the Southern District of Texas in 1992 and stayed in this position until she was nominated to the federal bench in 2003.

Federal judicial career
President George W. Bush nominated Crone on May 1, 2003, to a new seat created by 116 Stat. 1758. She was confirmed by the United States Senate on September 30, 2003, and received her commission on October 3, 2003.

Notable case
On October 4, 2016, Judge Crone entered a nationwide injunction blocking President Barack Obama’s Fair Pay and Safe Workplaces rule, known to its opponents as the blacklisting rule.  Judge Crone found the Due Process Clause and Free Speech Clause of the United States Constitution forbid the President from requiring federal contractors to disclose mere allegations that the contractor had violated labor laws.

References

Sources

1952 births
Living people
University of Texas at Austin alumni
University of Houston Law Center alumni
United States magistrate judges
Judges of the United States District Court for the Eastern District of Texas
United States district court judges appointed by George W. Bush
21st-century American judges
People from Dallas
21st-century American women judges